The Wielingen class is a class of four multi-functional frigates built for the Belgian Navy. The ships are named after sandbanks in the North Sea, not far from the Belgian coast, or sea routes. The lead ship is named after the Wielingen sandbank.

History
The Belgian government decided on 22 December 1970 to order four new frigates, which would be built by Belgian shipyards. The last of these left service in 1969.

Project studies had already begun in 1964 with the advice of the Dutch Navy and continued in 1971 in cooperation with the two Belgian shipyards, Boelwerf, at Temse, and Cockerill, at Hoboken, Antwerp. The construction of the ships began in 1974.

The fourth frigate, Westhinder, was decommissioned in 1993 according to the reforms of Defence Minister Leo Delcroix. She had previously been damaged during an anti-submarine exercise off the coast of Norway.  The third ship, Wandelaar, followed in 2004 and was sold to the Bulgarian Navy the same year. Wielingen and Westdiep were sold to Bulgaria in 2008.

Ships
Wielingen
 Built: Boelwerf, Temse 
 Launched: 30 March 1976
 Commissioned: 20 January 1978 
 Decommissioned: 2006
 Fate: Sold to Bulgaria in 2008, refurbished and commissioned as Verni (Верни – Faithful) (42)
 
Westdiep
 Built: Cockerill, Hoboken, Antwerp
 Launched: 8 December 1975
 Commissioned: 20 January 1978
 Decommissioned: 5 October 2007
 Fate: Sold to Bulgaria in 2008, refurbished and commissioned as Gordi (Горди – Proud) (43)

Wandelaar
 Built: Boelwerf, Temse
 Launched: 21 June 1977
 Commissioned: 3 October 1978 
 Fate: Sold to Bulgaria in 2004, refurbished and commissioned as Drazki (Дръзки – Daring) (41)

Westhinder
 Built: Cockerill, Hoboken, Antwerp 
 Launched: 30 March 1976
 Commissioned: 20 January 1978 
 Decommissioned: 1993
 Fate: Scrapped

See also
 List of naval ship classes in service

References

External links

 
Wielingen